Concord was the ship that in 1683 took the first group of German emigrants to America. On board of the galleon were 13 Mennonite families from Krefeld with a total of 33 people. The ship is also known as the "German Mayflower". Concord set sail on July 6, 1683, in Rotterdam under Captain William Jeffries with 57 passengers. The journey took 74 days to reach Philadelphia (Germantown) on October 6, 1683 (which was declared German-American Day in 1983).

See also 
 Germantown, Philadelphia#History and demographics
 German-American Day

References 

German-American culture in Philadelphia
German-American history
Ships of Germany
Mennonitism in the United States
First arrivals in the United States